Brewis is a surname. Notable people with the surname include:

Anne Brewis, daughter of Roundell Cecil Palmer, 3rd Earl of Selborne
Alexandra Brewis Slade, née Brewis, New Zealand-American anthropologist (and niece of Bev Brewis)
Bev Brewis (1930 – 2006), New Zealand high jumper
Hannes Brewis (1920–2007), South African rugby union player
Harry Brewis (born 1991), English YouTube personality
Henry Brewis (1932–2000), English artist and poet
John Brewis, British politician and barrister
Peter Brewis, British composer and musician
Peter Brewis (British musician), member of the band Field Music
Robert Brewis, English footballer
Tom Brewis (1907–1975), English footballer

See also
Fish and brewis, a traditional Newfoundland meal made with salt cod and hard tack
Brewis Island in the Great Barrier Reef Marine Park in Australia

References